The men's 89 kilograms competition at the 2018 World Weightlifting Championships was held on 6 November 2018.

Schedule

Medalists

Records

Results

References

External links
Results 
Results Group A 
Results Group B
Results Group C

Men's 89 kg